Westdorpe is a village in the Dutch province of Zeeland. It is a part of the municipality of Terneuzen, and lies about 31 km southeast of Vlissingen.

History 
The village was first mentioned in 1545 as Westdorp, and means "western village". West is relative to Axel. The original village was lost in a flood in 1545. It was rebuilt by 1570 to the south-west. In 1586, it was inundated as a result of the Dutch Revolt. The current Westdorpe dates from 1674 when the area was poldered. Westdorpe was part of the Spanish Netherlands until 1644 when it was conquered by the Dutch Republic.

The Visitation of Mary church was built in 1887. In 1940, it was blown up, and it was rebuilt in 1947. It is a three-aisled church with a detached tower. There used to be three beer breweries in Westdorpe.

Westdorpe was home to 1,410 people in 1840. Westdorpe was a separate municipality until 1970, when it was merged with Sas van Gent. In 2003, it became part of Terneuzen.

Notable people
  (1934—2021), politician and mayor of Huijbergen.

Gallery

Climate

References

Populated places in Zeeland
Former municipalities of Zeeland
Terneuzen